Paul Marx may refer to:

 Paul Marx (monk) (1920–2010), American Roman Catholic priest and Benedictine monk
 Paul John Marx (1935–2018), French Roman Catholic bishop

See also 
 Paul Marks (disambiguation)